Liberty Township is one of the fifteen townships of Putnam County, Ohio, United States.  The 2000 census found 1,575 people in the township, 1,304 of whom lived in the unincorporated portions of the township.

Geography
Located in the northern part of the county, it borders the following townships:
Marion Township, Henry County - north
Bartlow Township, Henry County - northeast corner
Van Buren Township - east
Blanchard Township - southeast corner
Ottawa Township - south
Greensburg Township - southwest corner
Palmer Township - west
Pleasant Township, Henry County - northwest corner

The village of West Leipsic is located in far eastern Liberty Township.

Name and history
Liberty Township was established in 1837. It is one of twenty-five Liberty Townships statewide.

Government
The township is governed by a three-member board of trustees, who are elected in November of odd-numbered years to a four-year term beginning on the following January 1. Two are elected in the year after the presidential election and one is elected in the year before it. There is also an elected township fiscal officer, who serves a four-year term beginning on April 1 of the year after the election, which is held in November of the year before the presidential election. Vacancies in the fiscal officership or on the board of trustees are filled by the remaining trustees.

References

External links
County website

Townships in Putnam County, Ohio
Townships in Ohio